Le Day railway station is a railway station in the municipality of Vallorbe, in the Swiss canton of Vaud. It is a Keilbahnhof, sitting at the junction of the standard gauge Simplon line of Swiss Federal Railways and Vallorbe–Le Brassus line of SBB and Travys.

Services 
 the following services stop at Le Day:

 RER Vaud
 : rush-hour service between Vallorbe and Le Brassus.

References

External links 
 
 

Railway stations in the canton of Vaud
Swiss Federal Railways stations